The European Communities (Amendment) Act 1993 (c. 32) is an Act of the Parliament of the United Kingdom. It amended the European Communities Act 1972 for the second time, to incorporate the provisions of the Treaty on European Union—which created the European Union—into the domestic law of the United Kingdom. The Act was given Royal Assent on 20 July 1993.

The Act was repealed by the European Union (Withdrawal) Act 2018 on 31 January 2020.

See also
 Acts of Parliament of the United Kingdom relating to the European Communities and the European Union
 European Economic Area
 European Communities 

Acts of the Parliament of the United Kingdom relating to the European Union
United Kingdom Acts of Parliament 1993
Euroscepticism in the United Kingdom